This is a list of notable people who were born or have lived in Chelyabinsk, Russia.

Born in Chelyabinsk

19th century

1801–1900 
 Vladimir Szmurlo (1865–1931), Russian Esperantist and railway engineer

20th century

1901–1940 
 Esphyr Slobodkina (1908–2002), popular artist, author and illustrator
 Sidney Gordin (1918–1996), Russian-born American artist and educator
 Makhmut Gareev (1923–2019), Russian General of the Army, historian and military scientist
 Evgeni Rogov (1929–1996), Russian and Soviet football player and football manager
 Yuri Klepikov (born 1935), Russian screenwriter and actor
 Tatyana Sidorova (born 1936), Russian speed skater
 Nelli Abramova (born 1940), Soviet competitive volleyball player and Olympic silver medalist in 1964

1941–1950 
 Aleksey Kuznetsov (born 1941), Russian guitarist, composer and guitar pedagogue
 Eduard Sibiryakov (1941–2014), Soviet volleyball player
 Svyatoslav Belza (1942–2014), Soviet Russian literary and musical scholar, critic and essayist
 Gennady Tsygurov (1942–2016), Russian professional ice hockey coach and former player
 Vera Popkova (1943–2011), Soviet track and field athlete
 Pyotr Shubin (born 1944), Russian professional football coach and former player
 Yuri Aizenshpis (1945–2005), Russian music manager and producer
 Boris Kopeikin (born 1945), Soviet football player and Russian coach
 Anna Sablina (born 1945), Russian speed skater
 Galina Starovoytova (1946–1998), Soviet dissident, Russian politician and ethnographer
 Anatoli Kartayev (born 1947), Russian and Soviet professional ice hockey player and coach
 Sergei Mikhalev (1947–2015), Russian ice hockey coach
 Nikolay Makarov (born 1948), Russian ice hockey player
 Yevgeny Kotlov (1949–2016), Soviet hockey player
 Evgeny Sveshnikov (born 1950), Russian, former Soviet and Latvian Grandmaster of chess and a chess writer

1951–1960 
 Aleksandr Voronin (1951–1992), Russian weightlifter and Olympic champion
 Alexander Panchenko (1953–2009), Russian chess Grandmaster
 Pavel Zhagun (born 1954), Russian poet, musician, record producer, artist and curator
 Sergei Babinov (born 1955), Soviet ice hockey player
 Oleg Mityaev (born 1956), Russian bard, musician and actor
 Viktor Khristenko (born 1957), Russian politician
 Vladimir Markelov (born 1957), Russian former gymnast
 Fail Mirgalimov (born 1957), Russian football manager and former player
 Nelli Rokita (born 1957), Polish politician
 Sergei Makarov (born 1958), Russian former ice hockey right wing and two-time Olympic gold medalist
 Sergei Mylnikov (born 1958), Soviet ice hockey player
 Svetlana Nikishina (born 1958), Soviet volleyball player
 Alexander Pochinok (1958–2014), Russian economist and politician
 Sergei Starikov (born 1958), Russian ice hockey coach and player
 Vyacheslav Bykov (born 1960), Soviet and Russian ice hockey player and a former head coach of the Russian national hockey team
 Alexander Seraphim (born 1960), Russian fashion designer and knitwear innovator

1961–1970 
 Irina Kostyuchenkova (born 1961), Soviet and Ukrainian female javelin thrower
 Yelena Skrynnik (born 1961), the first female minister of agriculture of the Russian Federation between 2009 and 2012
 Oleg Gusev (born 1964), Russian entrepreneur and politician
 Andrei Zuev (born 1964), Russian ice hockey goaltender
 Marat Romanov (born 1966), Russian wheelchair curler
 Evgeny Davydov (born 1967), Russian professional ice hockey player
 Yelena Sayko (born 1967), Russian race walker
 Leonid Novitskiy (born 1968), Russian cross-country rally driver
 Vadim Brovtsev (born 1969), Russian businessman who was Prime Minister of the Republic of South Ossetia from 2009 to 2012
 Svetlana Goundarenko (born 1969), Russian mixed martial artist and judoka
 Mikhail Yurevich (born 1969), Russian politician; former governor of Chelyabinsk Oblast (2010–2014)
 Ariel (formed 1970), Soviet "VIA" (pop/rock) band
 Sergey Gomolyako (born 1970), Russian ice hockey player
 Yuriy Konovalov (born 1970), Russian professional footballer
 Rishat Shafikov (born 1970), Russian race walker
 Yelena Yelesina (born 1970), Russian female high jumper; won the gold medal at the 2000 Summer Olympics with 2,01 m

1971–1975 
 Valeri Karpov (1971–2014), Soviet ice hockey player
 Andrei Sapozhnikov (born 1971), Soviet ice hockey player
 Denis Tsygurov (1971–2015), Russian professional ice hockey player
 Igor Varitsky (born 1971), Soviet ice hockey player
 Svetlana Bazhanova (born 1972), Russian speed skater
 Viktor Bulatov (born 1972), Russian football coach and a former international football player
 Artem Kopot (1972–1992), Russian professional ice hockey defenseman
 Natalya Polozkova (born 1972), Russian speed skater
 Eugene Roshal (born 1972), Russian software engineer
 Maksim Surayev (born 1972), Russian cosmonaut
 Lera Auerbach (born 1973), Soviet-Russian-born American classical composer and pianist
 Natalya Sokolova (born 1973), Russian biathlete
 Maxim Bets (born 1974), Russian professional ice hockey player
 Sergei Gonchar (born 1974), Russian professional ice hockey player
 Andrei Konovalov (born 1974), Russian professional football coach and a former player
 Maria Koroleva (born 1974), Russian water polo player
 Konstantin Lyzhin (born 1974), Russian football player
 Andrei Mezin (born 1974), Belarusian goaltender
 Andrei Nazarov (born 1974), Russian professional ice hockey player
 Kostyantyn Rurak (born 1974), Ukrainian sprinter
 Dmitry Yesipchuk (born 1974), Russian race walker
 Alexandre Boikov (born 1975), Russian ice hockey defenceman
 Evgeni Galkin (born 1975), Russian professional ice hockey winger
 Vitali Yachmenev (born 1975), Russian professional ice hockey left wing

1976–1980 
 Denis Peremenin (born 1976), Russian football player
 Dmitri Tertyshny (1976–1999), Russian professional ice hockey defenceman
 Konstantin Sidulov (born 1977), Russian professional ice hockey defenceman
 Alexei Tertyshny (born 1977), Russian professional ice hockey winger
 Svetlana Kaykan (born 1978), Russian speed skater
 Mikhail Koklyaev (born 1978), Russian National weightlifting champion, strongman competitor and powerlifter
 Rustam Akhmyarov (born 1979), Russian who was held in extrajudicial detention in the United States Guantanamo Bay detainment camps
 Anastasiya Kodirova (born 1979), Russian volleyball player
 Staņislavs Olijars (born 1979), Latvian athlete
 Yuliya Petrova (born 1979), Russian water polo player
 Nikolay Averyanov (born 1980), Russian decathlete
 Yekaterina Gamova (born 1980), Russian volleyball player
 Dmitri Kalinin (born 1980), Russian professional ice hockey defenceman
 Sofia Konukh (born 1980), Russian water polo player
 Konstantin Panov (born 1980), Russian professional ice hockey Right Wing
 Tatyana Sibileva (born 1980), Russian female race walker
 Anna Trebunskaya (born 1980), Russian born American professional ballroom and Latin dancer
 Alexei Zavarukhin (born 1980), Russian professional ice hockey center

1981–1985 
 Ivan Savin (born 1981), Russian professional ice hockey defenceman
 Danis Zaripov (born 1981), Russian professional ice hockey left winger
 Ivan Danshin (born 1982), Russian professional footballer
 Denis Kulakov (born 1982), Russian sport shooter
 Irina Kulikova (born 1982), Russian classical guitarist
 Evgeny Medvedev (born 1982), Russian professional ice hockey defenseman
 Olga Permyakova (born 1982), Russian ice hockey defender
 Yevgeni Yaroslavtsev (born 1982), Russian professional footballer
 Yegor Yevdokimov (born 1982), Russian handball player
 Stanislav Chistov (born 1983), Russian professional ice hockey player
 Georgy Gelashvili (born 1983), Russian professional ice hockey goaltender
 Aleksei Gorelkin (born 1983), Russian professional footballer
 Alexei Kaigorodov (born 1983), Russian professional ice hockey forward
 Kirill Koltsov (born 1983), Russian professional ice hockey defenceman
 Arseniy Lavrentyev (born 1983), Russian-born Portuguese professional swimmer
 Anton Vasilev (born 1983), Russian sprint canoer
 Tatyana Yerokhina (born 1984), Russian handball goalkeeper
 Marina Akulova (born 1985), Russian female volleyball player
 Igor Bogolyubskiy (born 1985), Russian speed skater
 Yuri Koksharov (born 1985), Russian professional ice hockey centre
 Igor Kurnosov (1985–2013), Russian chess grandmaster
 Iuliia Morozova (born 1985), Russian volleyball player
 Mariya Savinova (born 1985), Russian athlete
 Grigory Shafigulin (born 1985), Russian professional ice hockey player

1986–1990 
 Alexander Budkin (born 1986), Russian professional ice hockey defenceman
 Vladislav Fokin (born 1986), Russian professional ice hockey Goaltender
 Sergei Ignatyev (born 1986), Russian professional football player
 Evgeny Katichev (born 1986), Russian professional ice hockey defenceman
 Dmitry Starodubtsev (born 1986), Russian pole vaulter
 Ivan Ukhov (born 1986), Russian high jumper
 Vadim Berdnikov (born 1987), Russian professional ice hockey player
 Vladimir Ivanov, Russian badminton player
 Alexander Kalyanin (1987–2011), Russian professional ice hockey winger
 Yekaterina Malysheva (born 1987), Russian speed skater
 Ilya Zubov (born 1987), Russian professional ice hockey player
 Ivan Dorn (born 1988), Russian-born Ukrainian singer and TV presenter
 Anton Glinkin (born 1988), Russian professional ice hockey forward
 Mikhail Kuznetsov (born 1988), Russian pair skater
 Andrei Popov (born 1988), Russian professional ice hockey right winger
 Dmitri Sayustov (born 1988), Russian professional ice hockey centre
 Evgenii Dadonov (born 1989), Russian professional ice hockey player
 Aleksey Dremin (born 1989), Russian sprinter
 Oxana Guseva (born 1989), Russian Paralympic swimmer
 Vitali Menshikov (born 1989), Russian professional ice hockey player
 Kseniya Moskvina (born 1989), Russian swimmer
 Mikhail Pashnin (born 1989), Russian professional ice hockey defenceman
 Evgeny Rybnitsky (born 1989), Russian ice hockey defenceman
 Yevgeniya Startseva (born 1989), Russian volleyball player
 Danil Yerdakov (born 1989), Russian professional ice hockey player
 Nikita Zhdankin (born 1989), Russian professional football player
 Alexandra Vafina (born 1990), Russian Olympic ice hockey player
 Danila Alistratov (born 1990), Russian ice hockey goaltender
 Anastasia Baryshnikova (born 1990), Russian taekwondo practitioner
 Egor Dugin (born 1990), Russian professional ice hockey centre
 Olga Fatkulina (born 1990), Russian long-track speed skater
 Anton Lazarev (born 1990), Russian professional ice hockey forward
 Dmitri Kostromitin (born 1990), Russian professional ice hockey defenceman
 Vadim Muntagirov (born 1990), Russian ballet dancer
 Slava Voynov (born 1990), Russian professional ice hockey defenceman

1991–2000 
 Anton Burdasov (born 1991), Russian professional ice hockey forward
 Natalia Gantimurova (born 1991), Russian beauty pageant titleholder who was crowned Miss Russia 2011
 Maxim Karpov (born 1991), Russian professional ice hockey player
 Olga Kononenko (born 1991), second vice-miss to the Miss Russia 2010
 Ksenia Pervak (born 1991), Russian professional tennis player
 Aleksey Suvorov (born 1991), Russian speed-skater
 Anna Vinogradova (born 1991), Russian ice hockey goaltender
 Andrey Zubkov (born 1991), Russian basketball player
 Dmitri Akishin (born 1992), Russian professional ice hockey defenceman
 Vladislav Kartayev (born 1992), Russian ice hockey player
 Denis Kudryavtsev (born 1992), Russian athlete specialising in the 400 metres hurdles
 Evgeny Kuznetsov (born 1992), Russian professional ice hockey forward
 Yakov Toumarkin (born 1992), Israeli swimmer
 Zhan Bush (born 1993), Russian figure skater
 Sergey Glukhov (born 1993), Russian curler
 Nikita Nesterov (born 1993), Russian professional ice hockey defenceman
 Ksenia Pecherkina (born 1993), ice dancer
 Nikolai Prokhorkin (born 1993), Russian professional ice hockey player
 Maxim Shalunov (born 1993), Russian professional ice hockey player
 Ekaterina Alexandrova (born 1994), Russian professional tennis player
 Evgeniya Kosetskaya (born 1994), Russian female badminton player
 Vyacheslav Osnovin (born 1994), Russian ice hockey player
 Marina Shults (born 1994), Israeli group rhythmic gymnast
 Valeri Nichushkin (born 1995), Russian professional ice hockey right winger
 Viktor Poletaev (born 1995), Russian volleyball player
 Ekaterina Efremenkova (born 1997), Russian speed skater
 Yegor Nikulin (born 1997), Russian football player
 Ekaterina Borisova (born 1999), Russian pair skater

Lived in Chelyabinsk 
 Stanislav Hazheev (born 1941), the Minister of Defence in Transnistria
 Sergey Kovalev (born 1983), current WBO Light Heavyweight Boxing Champion; former IBF, WBA, the Ring Champion
 Vladimir Stepanov (born 1958), Russian armwrestler
 Oleg Znarok (born 1963), former Soviet and Latvian ice hockey player, with German citizenship since 2001; coach of the Russian national hockey team

See also 

 List of Russian people
 List of Russian-language poets

Chelyabinsk
Chelyabinsk
List